Louis Torres Dattero (born 29 April 2001) is a French professional footballer who plays as a left-back for  club Rodez on loan from the Belgian club Cercle Brugge.

Professional career
A youth product of Cavigal Nice, Torres moved to the youth academy of Monaco at the age of 13. Promoted to their reserves in 2020 where he became a starter, he signed a professional contrac with the club on 12 April 2022. On 19 July 2022, he transferred to the Belgian club Cercle Brugge. He made his professional debut with Cercle Brugge in a 2–0 Belgian First Division A loss to Westerlo on 24 July 2022, coming on as a substitute in the 83rd minute. In his first full start with the club, he scored the game winning goal in a 1–0 win over Anderlecht on 30 July 2022.

On 1 February 2023, Torres was loaned to Ligue 2 club Rodez.

Personal life
Born in France, Torres is of Spanish descent with Catalan roots. He is a fan of FC Barcelona.

Playing style
An attacking midfielder in his youth, Torres was retrained to play as a left-back at U19 level. He is known for his speed, and is not afraid to get into contact.

References

External links
 
 

2001 births
Footballers from Nice
French people of Spanish descent
French people of Catalan descent
Living people
French footballers
Association football fullbacks
AS Monaco FC players
Cercle Brugge K.S.V. players
Rodez AF players
Championnat National 2 players
Belgian Pro League players
French expatriate footballers
French expatriate sportspeople in Belgium
Expatriate footballers in Belgium